Prochoerodes is a genus of moths in the family Geometridae erected by Augustus Radcliffe Grote in 1883.

Species
Prochoerodes accentuata
Prochoerodes amplicineraria
Prochoerodes artemon
Prochoerodes completaria
Prochoerodes costipunctaria
Prochoerodes cristata
Prochoerodes exiliata
Prochoerodes flexilinea
Prochoerodes fleximargo
Prochoerodes forficaria
Prochoerodes gibbosa
Prochoerodes lineola
Prochoerodes marciana
Prochoerodes martina
Prochoerodes nonangulata
Prochoerodes olivata
Prochoerodes onustaria
Prochoerodes pilosa
Prochoerodes striata
Prochoerodes tetragonata
Prochoerodes transpectans
Prochoerodes transtincta
Prochoerodes truxaliata

References

Ourapterygini
Geometridae genera